Chionodes ermolaevi is a moth in the family Gelechiidae. It is found in the Russian Far East, where it has been recorded from Sakhalin Island.

References

Chionodes
Moths described in 2012
Moths of Asia